The Loyal Orange Institution, commonly known as the Orange Order, is an international Protestant fraternal order based in Northern Ireland and primarily associated with Ulster Protestants, particularly those of Ulster Scots heritage. It also has lodges in England, Scotland and the Republic of Ireland, as well as in parts of the Commonwealth of Nations and the United States. The Orange Order was founded by Ulster Protestants in County Armagh in 1795, during a period of Protestant–Catholic sectarian conflict, as a fraternity sworn to maintain the Protestant Ascendancy in Ireland. It is headed by the Grand Orange Lodge of Ireland, established in 1798. Its name is a tribute to the Dutch-born Protestant king William of Orange, who defeated Catholic king James II in the Williamite–Jacobite War (16881691). The order is best known for its yearly marches, the biggest of which are held on or around 12 July (The Twelfth), a public holiday in Northern Ireland.

The Orange Order is a conservative, British unionist and Ulster loyalist organisation. Thus it has traditionally opposed Irish nationalism/republicanism and campaigned against Scottish independence. The Order sees itself as defending Protestant civil and religious liberties, whilst critics accuse it of being sectarian, triumphalist and supremacist. It does not accept non-Protestants as members unless they convert and adhere to the principles of Orangeism, nor does it accept Protestants married to Catholics. Orange marches through Catholic neighbourhoods are controversial and have often led to violence, such as the Drumcree conflict.

History

The Orange Order celebrates the civil and religious privileges conferred on Protestants by William of Orange, the Stadtholder of the Dutch Republic who became King of England, Scotland, and Ireland in the Glorious Revolution of 1688. The Order regularly commemorates the victories of William III and his forces during the Williamite War in Ireland in the early 1690s, especially the Battle of the Boyne.

Formation and early years
Since the 1690s commemorations had been held throughout Ireland celebrating key dates in the Williamite War such as the Battle of Aughrim, Battle of the Boyne, Siege of Derry and the second Siege of Limerick. These followed a tradition started in Elizabethan England of celebrating key events in the Protestant calendar. By the 1740s there were organisations holding parades in Dublin such as the Boyne Club and the Protestant Society, both seen as forerunners to the Orange Order.

Armagh disturbances

Throughout the 1780s, sectarian tension had been building in County Armagh, largely due to the relaxation of the Penal Laws. Here the number of Protestants and Catholics (in what was then Ireland's most populous county) were of roughly equal number, and competition between them to rent patches of land near markets was fierce. Drunken brawls between rival gangs had by 1786 become openly sectarian. These gangs eventually reorganised as the Protestant Peep o' Day Boys and the Catholic Defenders, with the next decade in County Armagh marked by fierce sectarian conflict between both groups, which escalated and spread into neighbouring counties.

Battle of the Diamond

In September 1795, at a crossroads known as "The Diamond" near Loughgall, Defenders and Protestant Peep o' Day Boys gathered to fight each other. This initial stand-off ended without battle when the priest that accompanied the Defenders persuaded them to seek a truce, after a group called the "Bleary Boys" came from County Down to reinforce the Peep o' Day Boys. When a contingent of Defenders from County Tyrone arrived on 21 September, however, they were "determined to fight". The Peep o' Day Boys quickly regrouped and opened fire on the Defenders. According to William Blacker, the battle was short and the Defenders suffered "not less than thirty" deaths.

After the battle had ended, the Peep o' Days marched into Loughgall, and in the house of James Sloan they founded the Orange Order, which was to be a Protestant defence association made up of lodges. The principal pledge of these lodges was to defend "the King and his heirs so long as he or they support the Protestant Ascendancy". At the start the Orange Order was a "parallel organisation" to the Defenders in that it was a secret oath-bound society that used passwords and signs.

One of the very few landed gentry that joined the Orange Order at the outset, William Blacker, was unhappy with some of the outcomes of the Battle of the Diamond. He says that a determination was expressed to "driving from this quarter of the county the entire of its Roman Catholic population", with notices posted warning them "to Hell or Connaught". Other people were warned by notices not to inform on local Orangemen or "I will Blow your Soul to the Low hils of Hell And Burn the House you are in". Within two months, 7,000 Catholics had been driven out of County Armagh. According to Lord Gosford, the governor of Armagh:

A former Grand Master of the Order, also called William Blacker, and a former County Grand Master of Belfast, Robert Hugh Wallace have questioned this statement, saying whoever the Governor believed were the "lawless banditti", they could not have been Orangemen as there were no lodges in existence at the time of his speech. According to historian Jim Smyth:Later apologists rather implausibly deny any connection between the Peep-o'-Day Boys and the first Orangemen or, even less plausibly, between the Orangemen and the mass wrecking of Catholic cottages in Armagh in the months following 'the Diamond' – all of them, however, acknowledge the movement's lower-class origins.

The Order's three main founders were James Wilson (founder of the Orange Boys), Daniel Winter and James Sloan. The first Orange lodge was established in nearby Dyan, and its first grandmaster was James Sloan of Loughgall. Its first-ever marches were to celebrate the Battle of the Boyne and they took place on 12 July 1796 in Portadown, Lurgan and Waringstown.

United Irishmen rebellion
The Society of United Irishmen was formed by liberal Presbyterians and Anglicans in Belfast in 1791. It sought reform of the Irish Parliament, Catholic Emancipation and the repeal of the Penal Laws. By the time the Orange Order was formed, the United Irishmen had become a revolutionary group advocating an independent Irish republic that would "Unite Catholic, Protestant and Dissenter". United Irishmen activity was on the rise, and the government hoped to thwart it by backing the Orange Order from 1796 onward. Irish nationalist historians Thomas A. Jackson and John Mitchel argued that the government's goal was to hinder the United Irishmen by fomenting sectarianism, thereby creating disunity and disorder under pretence of "passion for the Protestant religion". Mitchel wrote that the government invented and spread "fearful rumours of intended massacres of all the Protestant people by the Catholics". Historian Richard R Madden wrote that "efforts were made to infuse into the mind of the Protestant feelings of distrust to his Catholic fellow-countrymen". Thomas Knox, British military commander in Ulster, wrote in August 1796 that "As for the Orangemen, we have rather a difficult card to play ... we must to a certain degree uphold them, for with all their licentiousness, on them we must rely for the preservation of our lives and properties should critical times occur".

The United Irishmen saw the Defenders as potential allies, and between 1794 and 1796 they formed a coalition. The United Irishmen, despite seeing the Defenders as "ignorant and poverty-stricken houghers and rick-burners" would claim in 1798 that they were indebted to the Armagh disturbances as the Orangemen had scattered politicised Catholics throughout the country and encouraged Defender recruitment, creating a proto-army for the United Irishmen to utilise.

The United Irishmen launched a rebellion in 1798. In Ulster, most of the United Irish commanders and many of the rebels were Protestant. Orangemen were recruited into the yeomanry to help fight the rebellion and "proved an invaluable addition to government forces". No attempt was made to disarm Orangemen outside the yeomanry because they were seen as by far the lesser threat. It was also claimed that if an attempt had been made then "the whole of Ulster would be as bad as Antrim and Down", where the United Irishmen rebellion was at its strongest. However, sectarian massacres by the Defenders in County Wexford "did much to dampen" the rebellion in Ulster. The Scullabogue Barn massacre saw over 100 non-combatant (mostly Protestant) men, women, and children imprisoned in a barn which was then set alight, with the Catholic and Protestant rebels ensuring none escaped, not even a child who it is claimed managed to break out only for a rebel to kill with his pike. In the trials that followed the massacres, evidence was recorded of anti-Orange sentiments being expressed by the rebels at Scullabogue. Partly as a result of this atrocity, the Orange Order quickly grew and large numbers of gentry with experience gained in the yeomanry came into the movement.

The homeland and birthplace of the Defenders was mid-Ulster and here they failed to participate in the rebellion, having been cowed into submission and surrounded by their Protestant neighbours who had been armed by the government. The sectarian attacks on them were so severe that Grand Masters of the Orange Order convened to find ways of reducing them. According to Ruth Dudley Edwards and two former Grand Masters, Orangemen were among the first to contribute to repair funds for Catholic property damaged in the rebellion.

One major outcome of the United Irishmen rebellion was the 1800 Act of Union that merged the Irish Parliament with that of Westminster, creating the United Kingdom of Great Britain and Ireland. Many Catholics supported the Act, but the Orange Order saw it as a threat to the "Protestant constitution" and 36 lodges in counties Armagh and Monaghan alone passed declarations opposing the Union.

Suppression

In the early nineteenth century, Orangemen were heavily involved in violent conflict with an Irish Catholic secret society called the Ribbonmen. One instance, publicised in a 7 October 1816 edition of the Boston Commercial Gazette, included the murder of a Catholic priest and several members of the congregation of Dumreilly parish in County Cavan on 25 May 1816. According to the article, "A number of Orangemen with arms rushed into the church and fired upon the congregation". On 19 July 1823 the Unlawful Oaths Bill was passed, banning all oath-bound societies in Ireland. This included the Orange Order, which had to be dissolved and reconstituted. In 1825 a bill banning unlawful associations – largely directed at Daniel O'Connell and his Catholic Association, compelled the Orangemen once more to dissolve their association. When Westminster finally granted Catholic Emancipation in 1829, Roman Catholics were free to take seats as MPs (and take up various other positions of influence and power from which they had been excluded) and play a part in framing the laws of the land. The likelihood of Irish Catholic members holding the balance of power in the Westminster Parliament further increased the alarm of Orangemen in Ireland, as O'Connell's 'Repeal' movement aimed to bring about the restoration of a separate Irish Parliament in Dublin, which would have a Catholic majority, thereby ending to the Protestant Ascendancy. From this moment on, the Orange Order re-emerged in a new and even more militant form.

In 1836 the Order was accused of plotting to place Ernest Augustus, Duke of Cumberland and Imperial Grand Master of the Orange Order, on the throne in place of Victoria when King William IV died; once the plot was revealed the House of Commons called upon the King to disband the Order. Under pressure from Joseph Hume, William Molesworth and Lord John Russell, the King indicated measures would have to be taken and the Duke of Cumberland was forced to dissolve the Orange lodges.

Hume laid evidence before the House of Commons of an approach in July 1832 to Lord Londonderry. A letter from Lieutenant-Colonel W. B. Fairman, Deputy Grand Secretary of the Orange Institution of Great Britain, advised the Marquess that following "a death of importance" (the passing of the King), the Orangemen would abandon their policy of "non-resistance" to the present "Popish Cabinet, and democratical Ministry" (the parliamentary reform ministry of Earl Grey) and that "it might be political to join" them. Londonderry demurred: he had no doubt that the Duke of Cumberland would be persuaded that "the present state of liberal Whig feeling in this very Whig county ... entirely preclude the possibility of successful efforts at this juncture".

In 1845 the ban was again lifted, but the notorious Battle of Dolly's Brae between Orangemen and Ribbonmen in 1849 led to a ban on Orange marches which remained in place for several decades. This was eventually lifted after a campaign of disobedience led by William Johnston of Ballykilbeg, Sovereign Grand Master of the Royal Black Institution, a senior Orange fraternity. Since the Fenian-organised funeral in Dublin for Terence McManus in 1861, Johnston had been asking: "If Nationalists are allowed such mobilisation, why are loyal Orangemen not allowed to march freely". On the Orange Twelfth 1867, he forced the issue by leading a large procession of Orangemen from Bangor to Newtownards in County Down. The contravention of the Party Procession Act earned him a two month prison sentence. The following year, as the standard bearer of United Protestant Working Men's Association of Ulster, Johnston was returned to Parliament for Belfast.

Revival and the Independent Order
By the late 19th century, the Order was in decline. However, its fortunes were revived in the 1880s after its embrace by the landlords in opposition to both the Irish Land League and later Home Rule. The Order was heavily involved in opposition to Gladstone's first Irish Home Rule Bill 1886, and was instrumental in the formation of the Ulster Unionist Party (UUP). Protestant opposition to Irish self-government under Roman Catholic influence was intense, especially in the Protestant-dominated province of Ulster.

In 1903, the Order suffered a split when Thomas Sloan left the organisation to set up the Independent Orange Order. Sloan had been suspended after running against the official unionist candidate on a pro-Belfast Protestant Association platform in the 1902 Belfast South by-election to succeed Johnston. For at least some of the independents, the split was a protest against what they saw as the co-optation of the Orange Order by the Ulster Unionist Party and its alignment with the interests of landlords and employers (the "fur coat brigade"). Their Grand Master, R. Lindsay Crawford outlined the new order's democratic manifesto in Orangeism, its history and progress: a plea for first principles (1904). However, his subsequent call in the Magheramorne Manifesto (1904) on Irish Protestants to "reconsider their position as Irish citizens and their attitude towards their Roman Catholic countrymen" proved too much for Sloan and most of the membership, and Crawford was eventually expelled.

Role in the partition of Ireland

In 1912 the Third Home Rule Bill was introduced in the British House of Commons. However, its introduction would be delayed until 1914. The Orange Order, along with the British Conservative Party and unionists in general, were inflexible in opposing the Bill. The Order helped to organise the 1912 Ulster Covenant – a pledge to oppose Home Rule which was signed by up to 500,000 people. In 1911 some Orangemen began to arm themselves and train as militias. In 1913 the Ulster Unionist Council decided to bring these groups under central control, creating the Ulster Volunteer Force, an Ulster-wide militia dedicated to resisting Home Rule. There was a strong overlap between Orange Lodges and UVF units. A large shipment of rifles was imported from Germany to arm them in April 1914, in what became known as the Larne gun-running.

However, the crisis was interrupted by the outbreak of the World War I in August 1914, which caused the Home Rule Bill to be suspended for the duration of the war. Many Orangemen served in the war with the 36th (Ulster) Division, suffering heavy losses, and commemorations of their sacrifice are still an important element of Orange ceremonies.

The Fourth Home Rule Act was passed as the Government of Ireland Act 1920; the six northeastern counties of Ulster became Northern Ireland and the other twenty-six counties became Southern Ireland. This self-governing entity within the United Kingdom was confirmed in its status under the terms of the Anglo-Irish Treaty of 1921, and in its borders by the Boundary Commission agreement of 1925. Southern Ireland became first the Irish Free State in 1922 and then in 1949 a Republic.

Since 1921

The Orange Order had a central place in the new state of Northern Ireland. From 1921 to 1969, every Prime Minister of Northern Ireland was an Orangeman and member of the Ulster Unionist Party (UUP); all but three Cabinet Ministers were Orangemen; all but one unionist Senators were Orangemen; and 87 of the 95 MPs who did not become Cabinet Ministers were Orangemen. James Craig, the first Prime Minister of Northern Ireland, maintained always that Ulster was in effect Protestant and the symbol of its ruling forces was the Orange Order. In 1932, Prime Minister Craig maintained that "ours is a Protestant government and I am an Orangeman". This was in response to a speech the year before by Eamonn de Valera in the Irish Free State claiming that Ireland was a "Catholic nation" in a debate about protests against Protestant woman Letitia Dunbar-Harrison being appointed as County Librarian in County Mayo. Two years later he stated: "I have always said that I am an Orangeman first and a politician and a member of this parliament afterwards ... All I boast is that we have a Protestant Parliament and a Protestant State".

At its peak in 1965, the Order's membership was around 70,000, which meant that roughly 1 in 5 adult Ulster Protestant males were members. Since 1965, it has lost a third of its membership, especially in Belfast and Derry. The Order's political influence suffered greatly after the unionist-controlled government of Northern Ireland was abolished in 1973.
In 2012, it was stated that estimated membership of the Orange Order was around 34,000.

After the outbreak of "the Troubles" in 1969, the Grand Orange Lodge of Ireland encouraged Orangemen to join the Northern Ireland security forces, especially the Royal Ulster Constabulary (RUC) and the British Army's Ulster Defence Regiment (UDR). The response from Orangemen was strong. Over 300 Orangemen were killed during the conflict, the vast majority of them members of the security forces. Some Orangemen also joined loyalist paramilitary groups. During the conflict, the Order had a fractious relationship with loyalist paramilitary groups, the Democratic Unionist Party (DUP), the Independent Orange Order and the Free Presbyterian Church. The Order urged its members not to join these organisations, and it is only recently that some of these intra-unionist breaches have been healed.

Drumcree dispute

The Drumcree dispute is perhaps the most well-known episode involving the Order since 1921. On the Sunday before 12 July each year, Orangemen in Portadown would traditionally march to-and-from Drumcree Church. Originally, most of the route was farmland, but is now the densely populated Catholic part of town. The residents have sought to re-route the march away from this area, seeing it as "triumphalist" and "supremacist".

There have been intermittent violent clashes during the march since the 19th century. The onset of the Troubles led to the dispute intensifying in the 1970s and 1980s. At this time, the most contentious part of the march was the outward leg along Obins Street. After serious violence two years in a row, the march was banned from Obins Street in 1986. The focus then shifted to the return leg along Garvaghy Road.

Each July from 1995 to 2000, the dispute drew worldwide attention as it sparked protests and violence throughout Northern Ireland, prompted a massive police/army operation, and threatened to derail the peace process. The situation in Portadown was likened to a "war zone" and a "siege". During this time, supporters of the Orangemen murdered at least six Catholic civilians. In 1995 and 1996, residents succeeded in stopping the march. This led to a standoff at Drumcree between the security forces and thousands of loyalists. Following a wave of loyalist violence, the march was allowed through. In 1997, security forces locked down the Catholic area and forced the march through, citing loyalist threats. This sparked widespread protests and violence by Irish nationalists. From 1998 onward the march was banned from Garvaghy Road and the Catholic area was sealed-off with large barricades. For a few years, there was an annual major standoff at Drumcree and widespread loyalist violence. Since 2001, things have been relatively calm, but the Order still campaigns for the right to march on Garvaghy Road. The dispute led to a short-lived boycott of businesses owned by Orangemen and their supporters elsewhere in the region.

Membership rates
Membership of the Order was historically lower in areas where Protestants are in the majority, and vice versa. In County Fermanagh, where the Catholic and Protestant populations are close to parity, membership in 1971 was three times as high as in the more Protestant counties of Antrim and Down, where it was just over 10% of adult Protestant males. Other factors that are associated with high rates of membership are levels of unemployment that more closely match Catholic levels, and low levels of support for the Democratic Unionist Party among unionists.

Beliefs and activities

Protestantism
The basis of the modern Orange Order is the promotion and propagation of "biblical Protestantism" and the principles of the Reformation. As such the Order only accepts those who confess a belief in a Protestant religion. As well as Catholics, non-creedal and non-Trinitarian Christians are also banned. This includes members of the Church of Jesus Christ of Latter-day Saints (Mormons), Jehovah's Witnesses, Unitarians, and some branches of Quakers.

Previous rules specifically forbade Roman Catholics and their close relatives from joining but the current rules  use the wording "non-reformed faith" instead. Converts to Protestantism can join by appealing to Grand Lodge.

Masonic influences
James Wilson and James Sloan, who issued the warrants for the first Lodges of the Orange Order along with 'Diamond' Dan Winter, were Freemasons, and in the 19th century many Irish Republicans regarded the Orange Order as a front group established by Unionist Masons as a more violent and jingoist vehicle for the promotion of Unionism. Some anti-Masonic evangelical Christian groups have claimed that the Orange Order is still influenced by freemasonry. Many Masonic traditions survive, such as the organisation of the Order into lodges. The Order has a similar system of degrees through which new members advance. These degrees are interactive plays with references to the Bible. There is particular concern over the ritualism of higher degrees such as the Royal Arch Purple and the Royal Black Institutions.

Sabbatarianism
The Order considers important the Fourth Commandment, and that it forbids Christians to work, or engage in non-religious activity generally, on Sundays. When the Twelfth of July falls on a Sunday the parades traditionally held on that date are held the next day instead. In March 2002, the Order threatened "to take every action necessary, regardless of the consequences" to prevent the Ballymena Show being held on a Sunday. The County Antrim Agricultural Association complied with the Order's wishes.

Politics
The Orange Order is strongly linked to British unionism. This is a political ideology that supports the continued unity of the United Kingdom. Unionism is thus opposed to, for example, the unification of Ireland and Scottish independence.

The Order, from its very inception, was an overtly political organisation. In 1905, when the Ulster Unionist Council (UUC) was formed, the Orange Order was entitled to send delegates to its meetings. The UUC was the decision-making body of the Ulster Unionist Party (UUP). Between 1922 and 1972, the UUP was consistently the largest party in the Northern Ireland Parliament, and all Prime Ministers of Northern Ireland and the vast majority of senior UUP figures were members of the Order. Due to its close links with the UUP, the Orange Order was able to exert great influence. The Order was the force behind the UUP no-confidence votes in reformist Prime Ministers Terence O'Neill (1969), James Chichester-Clark (1969–71), and Brian Faulkner (1972–74). At the outbreak of The Troubles in 1969, the Order encouraged its members to join the Northern Ireland security forces. The Democratic Unionist Party (DUP) attracted the most seats in an election for the first time in 2003. DUP leader Ian Paisley had been clashing with the Order since 1951, when the Order banned members of Paisley's Free Presbyterian Church from acting as Orange chaplains and later, from the 1970s, when it openly endorsed the UUP against the DUP. Recently, however, Orangemen have begun voting for the DUP in large numbers due to their opposition to the Good Friday Agreement. Relations between the DUP and Order have healed greatly since 2001, and there are now a number of high-profile Orangemen who are DUP MPs and strategists.

In December 2009, the Orange Order held secret talks with Northern Ireland's two main unionist parties, the DUP and UUP. The main goal of these talks was to foster greater unity between the two parties, in the run-up to the May 2010 general election. Sinn Féin's Alex Maskey said that the talks exposed the Order as a "very political organisation". Shortly after the election, Grand Master Robert Saulters called for a "single unionist party" to maintain the union. He said that the Order has members "who represent all the many shades of unionism" and warned, "we will continue to dilute the union if we fight and bicker among ourselves".

In the October 2010 issue of The Orange Standard, Grand Master Robert Saulters referred to 'dissident' Irish republican paramilitaries as the "Roman Catholic IRA". SDLP MLA John Dallat asked Justice Minister David Ford to find if Saulters had broken the hate speech laws. He said: "Linking the Catholic community or indeed any community to terror groups is inciting weak-minded people to hatred, and surely history tells us what that has led to in the past". In a 2011 survey of 1,500 Orangemen throughout Northern Ireland, over 60% believed that "most Catholics are IRA sympathisers".

In 2015, the Grand Orange Lodge of Ireland made a submission to the Northern Ireland Department of Arts, Culture and Leisure opposing the introduction of an Irish Language Bill. In its submission, the Lodge stated that it respected "Irish as one of the indigenous languages of the British Isles". However, the Lodge argued an Irish Language Act would promote inequality because it would be "directed towards a section of the Roman Catholic community".

Parades

Parades are a big part of the Order's activities. Most Orange lodges hold a yearly parade from their Orange hall to a local church. The denomination of the church is quite often rotated, depending on local demographics.

The highlights of the Orange year are the parades leading up to the celebrations on the Twelfth of July. The Twelfth, however, remains in places a deeply divisive issue, not least because of the alleged triumphalism, anti-Catholicism and anti-Irish nationalism of the Orange Order. In recent years, most Orange parades have passed peacefully. All but a handful of the Orange Order parades, at so-called "interface areas" where the two communities live next to each other, are peaceful.
The locations used for the annual Twelfth parades are located throughout the six counties of Northern Ireland with County Down having the most venues with thirty-three. Counties Armagh and Fermanagh having a smaller population both have twelve host venues. Some smaller villages such as Carrickmore, Cushendall, Rostrevor, Crossmaglen and Draperstown are not marched in at all and areas with a sizeable population like Coalisland and Dungiven have never been the host for a major Twelfth parade.

The Grand Lodge of Ireland does not recognise the Parades Commission, which it sees as having been founded to target Protestant parades, as Protestants parade at ten times the rate of Catholics. Grand Lodge is, however, divided on the issue of working with the Parades Commission. 40% of Grand Lodge delegates oppose official policy while 60% are in favour. Most of those opposed to Grand Lodge policy are from areas facing parade restrictions like Portadown District, Bellaghy, Derry City and Lower Ormeau.

In a 2011 survey of Orangemen throughout Northern Ireland, 58% said they should be allowed to march through Irish nationalist and Catholic areas with no restrictions; 20% said they should negotiate with residents first.

Orange halls

Monthly meetings are held in Orange halls. Orange halls on both sides of the Irish border often function as community halls for Protestants and sometimes those of other faiths, although this was more common in the past. The halls often host community groups such as credit unions, local marching bands, Ulster-Scots and other cultural groups as well as religious missions and unionist political parties.

Of the approximately 700 Orange halls in Ireland, 282 have been targeted by arsonists since the beginning of the Troubles in 1968. Paul Butler, a prominent member of Sinn Féin, has said the arson is a "campaign against properties belonging to the Orange Order and other loyal institutions" by nationalists. On one occasion a member of Sinn Féin's youth wing was hospitalised after falling off the roof of an Orange hall. In a number of cases halls have been badly damaged or completely destroyed by arson, while others have been damaged by paint bombings, graffiti and other vandalism. The Order claims that there is considerable evidence of an organised campaign of sectarian vandalism by Irish republicans. Grand Secretary Drew Nelson claims that statistical analysis shows that this campaign began in the last years of the 1980s and continues to the present.

Historiography
One of the Orange Order's activities is teaching members and the general public about William of Orange and associated subjects. Both the Grand Lodge and various individual lodges have published numerous booklets about William and the Battle of the Boyne, often aiming to show that they have continued relevance, and sometimes comparing the actions of William's adversary James II with those of the Northern Ireland Office. Furthermore, historical articles are often published in the Order's monthly newspaper The Orange Standard (available in a print edition and also electronically) and the Twelfth souvenir booklet. While William is the most frequent subject, other topics have included the Battle of the Somme (particularly the 36th (Ulster) Division's role in it), Saint Patrick (who the Order argues was not Roman Catholic), and the Protestant Reformation.

There are at least two Orange Lodges in Northern Ireland which they claim represent the heritage and religious ethos of Saint Patrick. The best known is the Cross of Saint Patrick LOL (Loyal Orange lodge) 688, instituted in 1968 for the purpose of (re)claiming Saint Patrick. The lodge has had several well-known members, including Rev Robert Bradford MP who was the lodge chaplain who himself was killed by the Provisional IRA, the late Ernest Baird. Today Nelson McCausland MLA and Gordon Lucy, Director of the Ulster Society are the more prominent members within the lodge membership. In the 1970s there was also a Belfast lodge called Oidhreacht Éireann (Ireland's Heritage) LOL 1303, which argued that the Irish language and Gaelic culture were not the exclusive property of Catholics or republicans.

William was supported by the Pope in his campaigns against James' backer Louis XIV of France, and this fact is sometimes left out of Orange histories.

Occasionally the Order and the more fundamentalist Independent Order publishes historical arguments based more on religion than on history. British Israelism, which claims that the British people are descended from the Israelites and that Queen Elizabeth II is a direct descendant of the Biblical King David, has from time to time been advanced in Orange publications.

War commemoration

The Order has been prominent in commemorating Ulster's war dead, particularly Orangemen and particularly those who died in the Battle of the Somme (1916) during World War I. There are many parades on and around 1 July in commemoration of the Somme, although the war memorial aspect is more obvious in some parades than others. There are several memorial lodges, and a number of banners which depict the Battle of the Somme, war memorials, or other commemorative images. In the grounds of the Ulster Tower Thiepval, which commemorates the men of the Ulster Division who died in the Battle of the Somme, a smaller monument pays homage to the Orangemen who died in the war.

Relationship with loyalist paramilitaries

The Orange Order has been criticised for associating with loyalist paramilitary groups such as the UVF and UDA, which are classified as terrorist organisations. However, it has publicly condemned terrorism and paramilitary violence. Some bands that appear at Orange marches openly display support for loyalist paramilitary groups, such as by carrying paramilitary flags or sporting paramilitary names and emblems. For example, prominent loyalist John Gregg was a member of Cloughfern Young Conquerors band, while Coleraine-based Freeman Memorial band was named after a UVF member who was killed by his own bomb. It has also been claimed that paramilitary groups approach certain bands asking the band to carry a flag of their organisation with financial assistance sometimes offered for doing so.

A number of prominent loyalist militants were members of the Orange Order at the same time. This includes Gusty Spence, Robert Bates, Davy Payne, David Ervine, John Bingham, George Seawright, Richard Jameson, Billy McCaughey, Robert McConnell and Ernie Elliott. The banner of Old Boyne Island Heroes Orange lodge bears the names of John Bingham and Shankill Butcher Robert Bates, who were both members. Another Shankill Butcher, UDR soldier Eddie McIlwaine, was pictured taking part in an Orange march in 2003 with a bannerette of killed UVF member Brian Robinson (who himself was an Orangeman). McIlwaine was also pictured acting as a steward at a 2014 Orange march. An Orange Order spokesman refused to condemn McIlwaine's membership of the Order.

On 12 July 1972, at least fifty masked and uniformed members of the Ulster Defence Association (UDA) escorted an Orange march into the Catholic area of Portadown, saluting the Orangemen as they passed. That year, Orangemen formed a paramilitary group called the Orange Volunteers. This group "bombed a pub in Belfast in 1973 but otherwise did little illegal other than collect the considerable bodies of arms found in Belfast Orange Halls". Portadown Orangemen allowed known militants such as George Seawright to take part in a 6 July 1986 march, contrary to a prior agreement. Seawright was a unionist politician and UVF member who had publicly proposed burning Catholics in ovens. As the march entered the town's Catholic district, the RUC seized Seawright and other known militants. The Orangemen attacked the officers with stones and other missiles.

When a July 1992 Orange march passed the scene of the Sean Graham bookmakers' shooting—in which the UDA killed five Catholic civilians—Orangemen shouted pro-UDA slogans and held aloft five fingers as a taunt to residents. Journalists Henry McDonald and Jim Cusack said images of Orangemen "gloating over the massacre" were beamed around the world and were a public relations disaster for the Order. Patrick Mayhew, then Secretary of State for Northern Ireland, said the marchers "would have disgraced a tribe of cannibals". The incident led to a more concerted effort by residents to have the marches banned from the area. In 2007, a banner commemorating UDA member Joe Bratty appeared at an Orange march. Bratty was said to have orchestrated the massacre.

Orange lodges in Britain have also been accused of links with loyalist paramilitaries. In the early years of The Troubles, the Order's Grand Secretary in Scotland toured Orange lodges for volunteers to "go to Ulster to fight". Thousands are believed to have volunteered although only a small number travelled to Ulster. During the 1970s an Orangeman—Roddy MacDonald—was the UDA's 'commander' in Scotland. In 1976, senior Scottish Orangemen tried to expel him after he admitted on television that he was a UDA leader and had smuggled weapons to Northern Ireland. However, his expulsion was blocked by 300 Orangemen at a special disciplinary hearing. His successor as Scottish UDA commander, James Hamilton, was also an Orangeman. Many Scottish Orangemen were also convicted for loyalist paramilitary activity, and some Orange meetings were used to raise funds for loyalist prisoners' welfare groups. In 2006, three Liverpool Orangemen were jailed for possession of weapons and UVF membership. Local MP Louise Ellman called for them to be expelled from the Order.

During the Drumcree standoffs, loyalist militants publicly supported the Orangemen and launched waves of violence across NI in protest at the Orange march being blocked. They smuggled homemade weaponry to Drumcree, apparently unhindered by the Orangemen, and attacked police lines. Members of the UDA/UFF appeared at Drumcree with banners supporting the Orangemen. Portadown Orange Lodge said it could not stop such people from gathering, but added that it welcomed any support. Loyalist Volunteer Force (LVF) leader Billy Wright was frequently seen at Drumcree in the company of Harold Gracey, head of Portadown Orange Lodge. Gracey later attended a rally in support of Wright and refused to condemn the loyalist violence linked to the standoff.

In the late 1990s, Stoneyford Orange Hall was reported to be a focal point for the Orange Volunteers. Following a police raid on the hall, two Orangemen were convicted for possession of "documents likely to be of use to terrorists", an automatic rifle, and membership of the Orange Volunteers. Their Orange lodge refused to expel them.

An Orangeman and DUP election candidate with links to the Real UFF in Antrim was jailed in 2013 for his part in a sectarian attack on a Polish family. He was expelled from the Order.

The Grand Orange Lodge of Ireland has issued several statements condemning violence and paramilitarism. Answering accusations of paramilitary links by Sinn Féin in 2011, an Orange spokesman said: "The Orange Order has consistently condemned all terrorist violence". In 2008, Armagh Orangemen condemned the flying of paramilitary flags. Denis Watson, the then secretary of the Grand Lodge of Ireland, has publicly called for anyone convicted of terrorist offences to be thrown out. Addressing a 12 July demonstration in 2000, Orangeman and Democratic Unionist politician Jeffrey Donaldson said "It is essential that the Orange Order does not allow the paramilitaries to infiltrate its parades or hijack legitimate protests as a means of flaunting their aggression and engaging in displays of naked intimidation ... The Orange Order stands for higher ideals than this and must at every opportunity condemn the illegal activities of the paramilitaries and of all those who engage in acts of violence". Eric Kaufmann, in his book The New Unionism, writes: "The Orange Order actually took a firm stand against violence and paramilitarism throughout the Troubles. This opposition was rooted in the large contingent of Protestant clergymen who are built into the power structure of the Order. Young Orangemen were urged to join the RUC (police) or UDR (local security forces) and to stay away from paramilitaries".

Requirements for entry

"An Orangeman should have a sincere love and veneration for his Heavenly Father, a humble and steadfast faith in Jesus Christ, the Saviour of mankind, believing in Him as the only Mediator between God and man. He should cultivate truth and justice, brotherly kindness and charity, devotion and piety, concord and unity, and obedience to the laws; his deportment should be gentle and compassionate, kind and courteous; he should seek the society of the virtuous, and avoid that of the evil; he should honour and diligently study the Holy Scriptures, and make them the rule of his faith and practice; he should love, uphold, and defend the Protestant religion, and sincerely desire and endeavour to propagate its doctrines and precepts; he should strenuously oppose the fatal errors and doctrines of the Church of Rome and other Non-Reformed faiths, and scrupulously avoid countenancing (by his presence or otherwise) any act or ceremony of Roman Catholic or other non-Reformed Worship; he should, by all lawful means, resist the ascendancy, encroachments, and the extension of their power, ever abstaining from all uncharitable words, actions, or sentiments towards all those who do not practice the Reformed and Christian Faith; he should remember to keep holy the Sabbath Day, and attend the public worship of God, and diligently train up his offspring, and all under his control, in the fear of God, and in the Protestant faith; he should never take the name of God in vain, but abstain from all cursing and profane language, and use every opportunity of discouraging those, and all other sinful practices, in others; his conduct should be guided by wisdom and prudence, and marked by honesty, temperance, and sobriety, the glory of God and the welfare of man, the honour of his Sovereign, and the good of his country, should be the motives of his actions."

Most jurisdictions require both the spouse and parents of potential applicants to be Protestant, although the Grand Lodge can be appealed to make exceptions for converts. Members have been expelled for attending Roman Catholic religious ceremonies. In the period from 1964 to 2002, 11% of those expelled from the order were expelled for their presence at a Roman Catholic religious event such as a baptism, service or funeral.  This is based on Reformed Christian theology, which teaches that the Roman Catholic Mass is idolatry, a view promulgated by Protestant Reformers such as Martin Luther.

The Order takes as its basis the Open Bible and historical Reformed documents such as the Presbyterian Westminster Confession, Anglican 39 Articles and other Protestant creeds.  All prospective members must affirm their Reformed Christian Faith prior to membership.

The Laws and Constitutions of the Loyal Orange Institution of Scotland of 1986 state, "No ex-Roman Catholic will be admitted into the Institution unless he is a Communicant in a Protestant Church for a reasonable period." Likewise, the "Constitution, Laws and Ordinances of the Loyal Orange Institution of Ireland" (1967) state, "No person who at any time has been a Roman Catholic ... shall be admitted into the Institution, except after permission given by a vote of seventy-five per cent of the members present founded on testimonials of good character ..." In the 19th century, Mortimer O'Sullivan, a converted Roman Catholic, was a Grand Chaplain of the Orange Order in Ireland. In the 1950s, Scotland also had a former Roman Catholic as a Grand Chaplain, William McDermott.

Structure

The Orange Institution in Ireland has the structure of a pyramid. At its base are about 1400 private lodges; every Orangeman belongs to a private lodge. Each private lodge sends six representatives to the district lodge, of which there are 126. Depending on size, each district lodge sends seven to thirteen representatives to the county lodge, of which there are 12. Each of these sends representatives to the Grand Orange Lodge of Ireland, which heads the Orange Order.

The Grand Lodge of Ireland has 373 members. As a result, much of the real power in the Order resides in the Central Committee of the Grand Lodge, which is made up of three members from each of the six counties of Northern Ireland (Down, Antrim, Armagh, Londonderry, Tyrone and Fermanagh) as well as the two other County Lodges in Northern Ireland, the City of Belfast Grand Lodge and the City of Londonderry Grand Orange Lodge, two each from the remaining Ulster counties (Cavan, Donegal and Monaghan), one from Leitrim, and 19 others. There are other committees of the Grand Lodge, including rules revision, finance, and education.

Despite this hierarchy, private lodges are basically autonomous as long as they generally obey the rules of the Institution. Breaking these can lead to suspension of the lodge's warrant – essentially the dissolution of the lodge – by the Grand Lodge, but this rarely occurs. Private lodges may disobey policies laid down by senior lodges without consequence. For example, several lodges have failed to expel members convicted of murder despite a rule stating that anyone convicted of a serious crime should be expelled, and Portadown lodges have negotiated with the Parades Commission in defiance of Grand Lodge policy that the commission should not be acknowledged.

Private lodges wishing to change Orange Order rules or policy can submit a resolution to their district lodge, which may submit it upwards until it eventually reaches the Grand Lodge.

All Lodge meetings commence with the reading of the Bible and prayers that non-practising Protestants, Roman Catholics and people of other faiths and none, 'may become wise unto salvation' (which is direct quote from 2 Timothy 3:15 in the Bible).

Related organisations

Association of Loyal Orangewomen of Ireland
A distinct women's organisation grew up out of the Orange Order. Called the Association of Loyal Orangewomen of Ireland, this organisation was revived in December 1911 having been dormant since the late 1880s. They have risen in prominence in recent years, largely due to protests in Drumcree. The women's order is parallel to the male order, and participates in its parades as much as the males apart from 'all male' parades and 'all ladies' parades respectively. The contribution of women to the Orange Order is recognised in the song "Ladies Orange Lodges O!".

Independent Orange Institution

The Independent Orange Institution was formed in 1903 by Thomas Sloan, who opposed the main Order's domination by Unionist Party politicians and the upper classes. A dispute between unionist candidates in East Belfast who were both Orangemen, saw one being kicked out of the Order for embarrassing an Orange grandee who had apparently not voted against a nationalist motion. The Independent Order originally had radical tendencies, especially in the area of labour relations, but this soon faded. In the 1950s and 60s the Independents focused primarily on religious issues, especially the maintenance of Sunday as a holy day and separation of politics from religion. With the outbreak of the Troubles, Ian Paisley began regularly speaking at Independent meetings, although he was never a member. As a result, the Independent Institution has become associated with Paisley and the Free Presbyterian Church of Ulster and Democratic Unionist Party. Recently the relationship between the two Orange Institutions has improved, with joint church services being held. Some people believe that this will ultimately result in a healing of the split which led to the Independent Orange Institution breaking away from the mainstream Order. Like the main Order, the Independent Institution parades and holds meetings on the Twelfth of July. It is based mainly in north Antrim.

Royal Black Institution

The Royal Black Institution was formed out of the Orange Order two years after the founding of the parent body. Although it is a separate organisation, one of the requirements for membership in the Royal Black is membership of the Orange Order and to be no less than 17 years old. The membership is exclusively male and the Royal Black Chapter is generally considered to be more religious and respectable in its proceedings than the Orange Order.

Apprentice Boys of Derry

The Apprentice Boys of Derry exist for their acts during the siege of Derry from James II. Although they have no formal connection with the Orange Order, the two societies have overlapping membership.

Throughout the world
The Orange Order was brought to other parts of the English-speaking world by Ulster Protestant migrants and missionaries. Grand Lodges have been set up in Scotland, England, Wales, Canada, Australia, New Zealand, the United States, and West Africa. However, the Grand Lodges of Ireland and Scotland have always been the largest by far. The Imperial Grand Orange Council is made up of representatives from all of these various Grand Lodges. It has the power to arbitrate in disputes between Grand Lodges, and in internal disputes when invited.

Famous Orangemen have included Thomas Barnardo, who joined the Order in Dublin; Mackenzie Bowell, who was Grandmaster of the Orange Order of British North America before becoming the Prime Minister of Canada; William Massey, who was Prime Minister of New Zealand; Harry Ferguson, inventor of the Ferguson tractor; and Earl Alexander, the Second World War general. Mohawk chief Oronhyatekha, an Oxford scholar, was also a member.

Republic of Ireland

The Grand Orange Lodge of Ireland represents lodges in both Northern Ireland and the Republic of Ireland, where Orangeism remains particularly strong in border counties such as County Cavan, County Monaghan and, in particular, County Donegal (especially East Donegal). Before the partition of Ireland, the Order's headquarters were in Dublin, which at one stage had more than 300 private lodges. After partition, the Order declined rapidly in the Irish Free State, which later became the Republic of Ireland. Following partition, parades continued to take place in Counties Monaghan and Cavan, but none have taken place in those counties since 1931. The last 12 July parade in Dublin took place in 1937. The last Orange parade in the Republic of Ireland is at Rossnowlagh in County Donegal, an event which has been largely free from trouble and controversy. It is held on the Saturday before the Twelfth as the day is not a holiday in the Republic of Ireland. There are still Orange lodges in nine counties of the Republic of Ireland – counties Cavan, Cork, Donegal, Dublin, Laois, Leitrim, Louth, Monaghan and Wicklow, but most either do not parade or travel to other areas to do so.

In February 2008 it was announced that the Orange Order was to be granted nearly €250,000 from the Department of Community, Rural and Gaeltacht Affairs. The grant is intended to provide support for members in border areas and fund the repair of Orange halls, many of which have been subjected to vandalism.

In July 2011 there were 45 Orange Lodges in the Republic.

Scotland

The Scottish branch of the Orange Order is the largest outside Ireland. The vast majority of Scotland's lodges are found in the Lowlands, especially the west Central Lowlands (Glasgow, Ayrshire, Renfrewshire, Lanarkshire).

Scotland's first Orange lodges were founded in 1798 by soldiers returning home from Ireland, where they had helped suppress an Irish republican rebellion. The Scottish branch grew swiftly in the early 1800s, when there was an influx of working-class Ulster Protestant immigrants into the Scottish Lowlands. Many of these immigrants saw themselves as returning to the land of their forefathers (see Plantation of Ulster).

As such, the Scottish branch has always had strong links with Ulster, and tends to be largest wherever there are most descendants of Irish Protestants. In 1881, three-quarters of its lodge masters were born in Ireland and, when compared to Canada, the Scottish branch has been both smaller (no more than two percent of adult male Protestants in west central Scotland have ever been members) and had more of an Ulster link.

Scottish Orangeism was associated with the Tory Party, especially with the Scottish Unionist Party. The Order's political influence crested between the World Wars, but was effectively nil thereafter as the Tory Party began to move away from Protestant politics.

After the onset of the Troubles, many Scottish Orangemen began giving support to loyalist militant groups in Northern Ireland, such as the Ulster Defence Association (UDA) and Ulster Volunteer Force (UVF). Although the Grand Lodge publicly denounced paramilitary groups, many Scottish Orangemen were convicted of involvement in loyalist paramilitary activity, and Orange meetings were used to raise funds for loyalist prisoners' welfare groups.

The Grand Orange Lodge of Scotland has long been opposed to Scottish independence. In 2007, 12,000 Orangemen and women marched along Edinburgh's Royal Mile to celebrate the 300th anniversary of the Act of Union. It registered as an official participant in the 2014 independence referendum and formed an anti-independence campaign group called British Together.

In 2004, former Scottish Orangeman Adam Ingram, then Armed Forces Minister, sued George Galloway for stating in his book I'm Not the Only One that Ingram had "played the flute in a sectarian, anti-Catholic, Protestant-supremacist Orange Order band". The Lord Ordinary, Lord Kingarth, ruled that the phrase was 'fair comment' on the Orange Order and that Ingram had been a member, although he had not played the flute.

Between 2012 and 2016, an ethnographic study of the social, religious, and political life of the Orange Order in Scotland was conducted by anthropologist Joseph Webster. This was published by Manchester University Press in 2020 as a book entitled The Religion of Orange Politics: Protestantism and Fraternity in Contemporary Scotland.

England

The Orange Order reached England in 1807, spread by soldiers returning to the Manchester area from service in Ireland. Since then, the English branch of the Order has generally supported the Conservative and Unionist Party.

The Orange Order in England is strongest in Liverpool including Toxteth and Garston. Its presence in Liverpool dates to at least 1819, when the first parade was held to mark the anniversary of the Battle of the Boyne, on 12 July. The Order was an important component in the founding of the Liverpool Protestant Party in 1909, keeping an association until the party's demise in 1974.

The Orange Order in Liverpool holds its annual Twelfth parade in Southport, a seaside town north of Liverpool. The Institution also holds a Junior parade there on Whit Monday. The Black Institution holds its Southport parade on the first Saturday in August. The parades in Southport have attracted controversy in recent times, with criticism of the disruption that results from the closure of main roads.

Other parades are held in Liverpool on the Sunday prior to the Twelfth and on the Sunday after. These parades along with Saint George's Day; Reformation Sunday and Remembrance Sunday go to and from church. Other parades are held by individual Districts of the Province, in all approximately 30 parades a year. One location is Petersfield in Hampshire, where the town square has an equestrian statue of King William III, as does Hull.

Wales 
Cymru LOL 1922 was the only Orange lodge in Wales. A new Lodge in Cardiff opened on 17 March 2012, the first new Orange Lodge to be opened there for over 90 years.

Canada

Founded by Ogle Gowan, in Brockville Ontario, the Orange Order played an important role in the history of Canada, where it was established in 1830. Most early members were from Ireland, but later many English, Scots, Italians and other Protestant Europeans joined the Order, as well as Mohawk Native Americans. Four Canadian prime ministers were Orangemen. Toronto was the epicentre of Canadian Orangeism: most mayors were Orange until the 1950s, and Toronto Orangemen battled against Ottawa-driven initiatives like bilingualism and Catholic immigration. The Toronto lodge has held an annual Orange parade since 1821, claiming it to be the longest running consecutive parade on the North American continent. A third of the Ontario legislature was Orange in 1920, but in Newfoundland, the proportion has been as high as 50% at times. Indeed, between 1920 and 1960, 35% of adult male Protestant Newfoundlanders were Orangemen, as compared with just 20% in Northern Ireland and 5%–10% in Ontario in the same period.

In addition to Newfoundland and Ontario, the Orange Order played an important role in the frontier regions of Quebec, including the Gatineau-Pontiac, Quebec region. The region's earliest Protestant settlement occurred when fifteen families from County Tipperary settled in the valley in Carleton County after 1818. These families spread across the valley, settling towns near Shawville, Quebec. Despite these early Protestant migrants, it was only during the early 1820s that a larger wave of Irish migrants, many of them Protestants, came to the Ottawa valley region.  Orangism developed throughout the region's Protestant communities, including Bristol, Lachute- Brownsburg, Shawville and Quyon. After further Protestant settlement throughout the 1830s and 40s, the Pontiac region's Orange Lodges developed into the largest rural contingent of Orangism in the Province. The Orange Lodges were seen as community cultural centres, as they hosted numerous dances, events, parades, and even the teaching of step dancing. Orange Parades still occur in the Pontiac-Gatineau- Ottawa Valley area; however, not every community hosts a parade. Now one larger parade is hosted by a different town every year.

United States

Participation in the Orange Institution was not as large in the United States as it was in Canada. In the early nineteenth century, the post-Revolutionary republican spirit of the new United States attracted exiled Protestant United Irishmen such as Wolfe Tone and others. Most Protestant Irish immigrants in the first several decades of the century were those who held to the republicanism of the 1790s, and who were unable to accept Orangeism. Loyalists and Orangemen made up a minority of Irish Protestant immigrants during this period. America offered a new beginning, and "... most descendents of the Ulster Presbyterians of the eighteenth century and even many new Protestant Irish immigrants turned their backs on all associations with Ireland and melted into the American Protestant mainstream."

Most of the Irish loyalist emigration was bound for Upper Canada and the Maritime provinces, where Orange lodges were able to flourish under the British flag.  By 1870, when there were about 930 Orange lodges in Ontario, there were only 43 in the entire eastern United States.

The few American lodges were founded by newly arriving Protestant Irish immigrants in coastal cities such as Philadelphia and New York.  The Institution maintained a home for sick and aged members.  Qualifications for membership were restrictive, according to their "Declaration of Principles", and "no person who ever was or is a Roman Catholic, or who shall educate, or cause to be educated, his children or any children in his charge, in any Roman Catholic school, convent, nunnery or monastery, shall ever be admitted to membership."  These ventures were short-lived and of limited political and social impact, although there were specific instances of violence involving Orangemen between Catholic and Protestant Irish immigrants, such as the Orange Riots in New York City in 1824, 1870 and 1871.

The first "Orange riot" on record was in 1824, in Abingdon, New York, resulting from a 12 July march. Several Orangemen were arrested and found guilty of inciting the riot. According to the State prosecutor in the court record, "the Orange celebration was until then unknown in the country". The immigrants involved were admonished: "In the United States the oppressed of all nations find an asylum, and all that is asked in return is that they become law-abiding citizens. Orangemen, Ribbonmen, and United Irishmen are alike unknown. They are all entitled to protection by the laws of the country."

The Orange riots of 1870 and 1871 killed nearly 70 people, and were fought out between Irish Protestant and Catholic immigrants. After this the activities of the Orange Order were banned for a time, the Order dissolved, and most members joined Masonic lodges. After 1871, there were no more riots between Irish Catholics and Protestants.

In 1923 the Loyal Orange Institution of the United States of America had 32,862 members in 256 lodges. The office of the "Supreme Grand Secretary" was at 229 Rhode Island Avenue, Washington, D.C.. There was apparently a split in the group in the early 1920s.

There are currently two Orange Lodges in New York City, one in Manhattan and the other in the Bronx.

The Ulster-Scots LOL 1690 was established in Torrance, California in 1998. It was the first new lodge to be instituted in the US for more than 20 years. The latest American Lodge, Heirs of Cromwell LOL 1599 was formed in 2011 in Naples, Florida.

Australia

The first Orange Institution Warrant (No. 1780) arrived in Australia with the ship . It was sewn in the tunic of Private Andrew Alexander of the 50th Regiment. The 50th was mainly Irish; many of its members were Orangemen belonging to the Regimental lodge and they had secretly decided to retain their lodge warrant when they had been ordered to surrender all military warrants, believing that the order would eventually be rescinded and that the warrant would be useful in Australia.

There are five state Grand Lodges in Australia which sit under the warrant of the Grand Lodge of Australia, the overall governing body for the institution in Australia.

New Zealand

New Zealand's first Orange lodge was founded in Auckland in 1842, only two years after the country became part of the British Empire, by James Carlton Hill of County Wicklow. The lodge initially had problems finding a place to meet, as several landlords were threatened by Irish Catholic immigrants for hosting it. The arrival of large numbers of British troops to fight the New Zealand Wars of the 1860s provided a boost for New Zealand Orangeism, and in 1867 a North Island Grand Lodge was formed. A decade later a South Island Grand Lodge was formed, and the two merged in 1908.

From the 1870s the Order was involved in local and general elections, although Rory Sweetman argues that 'the longed-for Protestant block vote ultimately proved unobtainable'. Processions seem to have been unusual before the late 1870s: the Auckland lodges did not march until 1877 and in most places Orangemen celebrated the Twelfth and 5 November with dinners and concerts. The emergence of Orange parades in New Zealand was probably due to a Catholic revival movement which took place around this time. Although some parades resulted in rioting, Sweetman argues that the Order and its right to march were broadly supported by most New Zealanders, although many felt uneasy about the emergence of sectarianism in the colony. From 1912 to 1925 New Zealand's most famous Orangeman, William Massey, was Prime Minister. During World War I Massey co-led a coalition government with Irish Catholic Joseph Ward. Historian Geoffrey W. Rice maintains that William Massey's Orange sympathies were assumed rather than demonstrated.

Te Ara: The Encyclopedia of New Zealand argues that New Zealand Orangeism, along with other Protestant and anti-Catholic organisations, faded from the 1920s. The Order has certainly declined in visibility since that decade, although in 1994 it was still strong enough to host the Imperial Orange Council for its biennial meeting. However parades have ceased, and most New Zealanders are probably unaware of the Order's existence in their country. The New Zealand Order is unusual in having mixed-gender lodges, and at one point had a female Grand Master.

West Africa

Ghana

The Orange Order in Ghana was founded by Ulster-Scots missionaries some time during the early twentieth century, and is currently supported by the Institute of Ulster Scots Studies. Its rituals mirror those of the Orange Order in Ulster, though it does not place restrictions on membership for those who have Roman Catholic family members. The Orange Order in Ghana appears to be growing, largely based with the growing democracy there.

Nigeria

The first Orange Lodge in Nigeria was the Lagos Fine Blues LOL 801, which was first listed in 1907 in the returns of Woolwich District 64 to the Grand Orange Lodge of England, this District providing the traditional 'home' to overseas and military Lodges. Altogether there were three male lodges and one female lodge. They all appear to have died out some time in the 1960s, due to political unrest. Conversely the Ghana lodges increased greatly in popularity with the return of democracy.

Togo

In 1915, John Amate Atayi, a member of the Lagos Fine Blues LOL 801 moved to Lome, Togo, for work. Here he founded the Lome Defenders of the Truth LOL 867, under warrant of the Grand Orange Lodge of England. In 1916 a second lodge, Paline Heroes LOL No 884 was constituted.

'Diamond Dan'
As part of the re-branding of Orangeism to encourage younger people into a largely ageing membership, and as part of the planned rebranding of the July marches into an 'Orangefest', the 'superhero' Diamond Dan was created – named after one of its founding members, 'Diamond' Dan Winter – Diamond referring to the Institution's formation at the Diamond, Loughgall, in 1795.

Initially unveiled with a competition for children to name their new mascot in November 2007 (it was nicknamed 'Sash Gordon' by several parts of the British media); at the official unveiling of the character's name in February 2008, Orange Order education officer David Scott said Diamond Dan was meant to represent the true values of the Order: "... the kind of person who offers his seat on a crowded bus to an elderly lady. He won't drop litter and he will be keen on recycling". There were plans for a range of Diamond Dan merchandise designed to appeal to children.

There was however, uproar when it was revealed in the middle of the 'Marching Season' that Diamond Dan was a repaint of illustrator Dan Bailey's well-known "Super Guy" character (often used by British computer magazines), and taken without his permission, leading to the character being lampooned as "Bootleg Billy".

List of members

Grand Masters
Grand Masters, of the Grand Orange Lodge of Ireland:
1795: William Blacker (Unofficial)
1798 Thomas Verner
1801: George Ogle
1818: Mervyn Archdall (to 1822)
1822?: Earl O'Neill
1828: Duke of Cumberland
1836: Earl of Roden (Unofficial)
1845: Earl of Enniskillen
1886: Earl of Erne
1914: Sir James Stronge, 5th Baronet
1915: William H. H. Lyons
1926: Sir Edward Archdale, 1st Baronet
1941: Sir Joseph Davison
1948: J. M. Andrews
1954: Sir William McCleery
1957: Sir George Clark, 3rd Baronet
1968: John Bryans
1971: Martin Smyth
1996: Robert Saulters
2011: Edward Stevenson

University Societies
Both major universities in Northern Ireland have student societies to promote Orangeism on campus. Students at Queen's University Belfast formed the first 'Student's Orange Society' in May 2007 aiming to, "educate the students of Queen's on the different aspects of the Orange Order." Societies were later formed at Ulster University, first at the Jordanstown campus in 2010, followed by Coleraine in 2012. The societies engage in a range of cultural, historical and social events. Any student can join the Orange Society at their university regardless of their religion or background.

See also
Anti-Catholicism
Drumcree conflict
Presbyterian Church in Ireland
Royal Black Institution

Notes and references

Further reading

 (Considered the principal study of English Orange traditions)
 (Strongly favourable)

Canada and United States:

Pierre-Luc Bégin (2008). " Loyalisme et fanatisme ", Petite histoire du mouvement orangiste Canadien, Les Éditions du Québécois, 2008, 200 p..
Luc Bouvier, (2002). « Les sacrifiés de la bonne entente » Histoire des francophones du Pontiac, Éditions de l'Action nationale.

External links

The Grand Orange Lodge Of Ireland
The Independent Loyal Orange Institution
Grand Orange Lodge of England
Eric Kaufmann's Orange Order Page
The Orange Order, Militant Protestantism and anti-Catholicism: A Bibliographical Essay (1999)
Eric Kaufmann's Orange Order Page

 
1795 establishments in Ireland
Patriotic societies
Christian fundamentalism
Protestant organizations
Protestantism in the United Kingdom
Anti-Catholicism in Northern Ireland
Anti-Catholic organizations
Ulster unionist organisations
All-Ireland organisations
Ulster Scottish
Critics of the Catholic Church
William III of England